Fuel for the Hate Game is the first full-length album by Hot Water Music. Fuel... was released by Toybox Records and No Idea Records in 1997, later repressings only listed No Idea. The album features artwork by Scott Sinclair (not to be confused with Scott Sinclair) and was designed by Sean Bonner.

The track "Freightliner" was featured on the soundtrack to the skateboarding video game Tony Hawk's Pro Skater 4. Paste included the song on a list of "20 Best Drinking Songs".

Reception
Allmusic reviewed the album as "raw and unrelenting, but it is also a refreshing release of energy, and an infectious one at that. This is the record that saw the band rise to the top of the hardcore/punk scene, and, years after its release, it is still as deserving of credit as it ever was."
The A.V. Club stated the album (and their next album released later that year) "stand as two of ’90s’ punk’s proudest monuments—records that cut through all the squabbling, all the second-guessing, and all the politics of the punk scene and straight into its aching heart.

Track listing

Personnel 
Chuck Ragan - guitar/vocals
Chris Wollard - guitar/vocals
Jason Black - bass guitar
George Rebelo - drums

References

Hot Water Music albums
1998 albums